Silvânia Costa de Oliveira (born 23 May 1987) is a visually impaired Brazilian Paralympic athlete. She is a two-time gold medalist at the Summer Paralympics. She won the gold medal in the women's long jump T11 event both at the 2016 Summer Paralympics held in Rio de Janeiro, Brazil and at the 2020 Summer Paralympics held in Tokyo, Japan.

Her brother Ricardo Costa de Oliveira won a gold medal at the 2016 Summer Paralympics in the men's long jump T11 event.

Achievements

References

External links 

 

1987 births
Living people
People from Três Lagoas
Brazilian female long jumpers
Medalists at the 2015 Parapan American Games
Paralympic athletes of Brazil
Paralympic gold medalists for Brazil
Paralympic athletes with a vision impairment
Paralympic medalists in athletics (track and field)
Athletes (track and field) at the 2016 Summer Paralympics
Athletes (track and field) at the 2020 Summer Paralympics
Medalists at the 2016 Summer Paralympics
Medalists at the 2020 Summer Paralympics
Sportspeople from Mato Grosso do Sul
21st-century Brazilian women
Brazilian blind people